This is a list of notable jewelry designers.

Argentina

 Ricardo Basta

Australia

 Joanna Angelett
 Wilfrid Nelson Isaac
 Alice Elsie Reeve

Austria

 Ingo Appelt
 Elena Kriegner
 Nettie Rosenstein
 Daniel Swarovski

Belgium

 Lodewyk van Bercken
 Philippe Van Dievoet
 Larisa Popova

Brazil

 Kim Poor
 Fernando Jorge

Canada

 Lois Betteridge
 H.V. Dalling
 Charles Edenshaw
 David Neel
 Bill Reid
 Tobi Wong
 Dean Davidson

Czech Republic

 George Brooks
 Julie Wimmer

Denmark

 Joachim Matthias Wendt

Dominican Republic
 Jenny Polanco

Estonia

 Kadri Mälk

France

 Louis Aucoc
 Dominique Aurientis
 Guy Bedarida
 Suzanne Belperron
 Marcel Boucher
 Frédéric Boucheron
 Jacques-Théodule Cartier
 Pierre C. Cartier
 Dolly Cohen
 Jean-Baptiste Fossin
 James de Givenchy
 Robert Goossens
 Jade Jagger
 René Sim Lacaze
 René Lalique
 Jean Mayeur
 Robert Mazlo
 Jean-Valentin Morel
 Alexandra Nereïev
 Marie-Etienne Nitot
 Sebastien Parfait
 Paloma Picasso
 Jacques von Polier
 Alexandre Reza
 Fred Samuel
 Jean Schlumberger
 Lea Stein
 Pierre Sterlé

Germany

 Jakob Bengel
 Gregor Clemens
 Carl Dau
 Joachim Grallert
 Heidrun Mohr-Mayer
 Anni Schaad
 Julius Ludwig Schomburgk
 Georg Friedrich Strass
 Ferdinand Anton Nicolaus Teutenberg
 Lilian von Trapp

Greece

 Ilias Lalaounis
 Elena Votsi
 Sotirios Voulgaris

Guyana

 Vannetta Seecharran

Hong Kong

 Wallace Chan

Hungary

 Zoltan David

India

 Waris Ahluwalia
 Farah Khan Ali
 Khailshanker Durlabhji
 Shantidas Jhaveri
 Neelam Kothari
 Nayna Mehta
 Sudha Pennathur
 Suhani Pittie
 Ambaji Shinde

Ireland

 Slim Barrett
 Melissa Curry

Israel

 Dorrit Moussaieff

Italy

 Loris Abate
 Akelo (Andrea Cagnetti)
 Carolina Bucci
 Gianni Bulgari
 Fortunato Pio Castellani
 Benvenuto Cellini
 Ugo Correani
 Enrico and Damiano Damiani
 Carlo Giuliano
 Andrew Grima
 Allessandro Masnago
 Roberto Faraone Mennella
 Giovanni Sebastiano Meyandi
 Elsa Peretti
 Luciana Pignatelli
 Giò Pomodoro
 Ippolita Rostagno
 Fulco di Verdura

Japan

 Yasuki Hiramatsu
 Kimiko Kasai
 Akiko Kawarai
 Mikimoto Kōkichi

Lebanon

 Dina Azar
 Selim Mouzannar
 Tabbah

Netherlands 
 Gijs Bakker
 Bert Nienhuis
 Ted Noten
 Marly van der Velden

Norway 
 Celine Engelstad

Pakistan

 Tapu Javeri

Romania 
 Daniel Stoenescu

Russia

 Dmitriy Bellman
 Carl Edvard Bolin
 Erté
 Gustav Fabergé
 Peter Carl Fabergé
 Joseph Marchak

Spain

 Salvador Dalí

South Africa

Sweden

 Efva Attling
 Arne Blomberg
 Carolina Gynning
 Vivianna Torun Bülow-Hübe

Switzerland

 Kurt Aepli
 Gilbert Albert
 Jean Jahnsson

Taiwan

 Cindy Chao
 Onch Movement

Turkey

 Gurhan Orhan

Ukraine 

 Natasha Zinko

United Kingdom

 Joanna Angelett
 Kali Arulpragasam
 Bec Astley Clarke
 Solange Azagury-Partridge
 Tom Binns
 Judy Blame
 Robert Brandon
 John Brogden
 Jocelyn Burton
 John Paul Cooper
 David Stewart Dawson
 Nelson Dawson
 Monty Don
 John Donald
 Samuel Henry Drew
 Annoushka Ducas
 Theo Fabergé
 Theo Fennell
 John Francillon
 Elizabeth Gage
 Arthur Gaskin
 Georgie Gaskin
 Sabine Getty
 Ola Gorie
 Laurence Graff
 John Greed
 Andrew Grima
 John Hardy
 Sophie Harley
 George Heriot
 William Herrick
 Philippa Holland
 Charles Horner
 George Edward Hunt
 Annabel Jones
 Shaun Leane
 Andrew Logan
 Joseph Mayer
 Kiki McDonough
 Flora McLean
 Edith Emily Morris
 Ella Naper
 Louise Nippierd
 Ari Norman
 Dorrie Nossiter
 Henry Raeburn
 Angharad Rees
 Tony Swatton
 James Tassie
 William Tassie
 Monica Vinader
 David Watkins
 James Cromar Watt
 Stephen Webster

United States

* James Avery
 Webb C. Ball
 Bill Barrett
 BillyBoy*
 Gail Bird
 Alexis Bittar
 Steven Brody
 Richard Shaw Brown
 Daniel Brush
 Ben Nighthorse Campbell
 Alexander Calder
 Eric Daman
 Henry Dunay
 Robert Ebendorf
 Marie el-Khoury
 Mignon Faget
 Paulding Farnham
 Jennifer Fisher
 Paul Flato
 Susan Foster
 Sophia Forero
 Jane A. Gordon
 William Snelling Hadaway
 William Claude Harper
 Miriam Haskell
 George W. Headley
 Joan Hornig
 Michael Horse
 Holly Hosterman
 Mary Lee Hu
 Richard W. Hughes
 Yazzie Johnson
 Fred Kabotie
 Michael Kabotie
 Jessica Kagan Cushman
 Alfred Karram
 Martin Katz
 Linda Fry Kenzle
 Omar Kiam
 Alexis Kirk
 Florence Koehler
 Carolyn Kriegman
 Kenneth Jay Lane
 Stanley Lechtzin
 Charles Loloma
 Pamela Love
 Mary Lyon
 Peter Macchiarini
 Linda MacNeil
 Tim McCreight
 Jennifer Meyer
 Alexandra Mor
 Robert Lee Morris
 Celia Newman
 Clifton Nicholson
 Kevin O'Dwyer
 Gurhan Orhan
 Dellamarie Parrilli
 Philip Press
 Nettie Rosenstein
 Marty Ruza
 Cynthia Sakai
 Atsidi Sani
 Marjorie Schick
 Lorraine Schwartz
 Kendra Scott
 Celia Sebiri
 Emory Sekaquaptewa
 Coreen Simpson
 Tommy Singer
 Albion Smith
 Bill Smith
 Mimi So
 Hans Stern
 Tarina Tarantino
 Maria Tash
 Rachelle Thiewes
 Charles Lewis Tiffany
 Louis Comfort Tiffany
 Justin Tranter
 Betony Vernon
 Diana Vincent
 Cathy Waterman
 Stephanie Wells
 Harry Winston
 Sherry Wolf
 Alex Woo
 David Yurman
 Marie Zimmermann

Vietnam

 Rosalina Lydster

See also 

 List of fashion designers
 List of footwear designers

References

External links

 
Lists of people by occupation
Design-related lists
 
Fashion-related lists